A list of tundra ecoregions from the World Wide Fund for Nature (WWF) includes:

See also
 Tundra

External links
 Arctic tundra biome information from the WWF
 Alpine tundra information from the WWF
 The Arctic biome at Classroom of the Future

References

Tundra
Tundra